The 2019 Ladies Tour of Norway is the seventh edition of the Ladies Tour of Norway, a women's cycling stage race in Norway and part of the 2019 UCI Women's World Tour.

Teams

Nineteen professional teams, and one national team, each with a maximum of six riders, will start the race:

National teams: 
 Norway

Stages

Stage 1
22 August 2019 – Åsgårdstrand to Horten,

Stage 2
23 August 2019 – Mysen to Askim,

Stage 3
24 August 2019 – Moss to Halden,

Stage 4
25 August 2019 – Svinesund to Halden,

Classification progress

References

UCI Women's World Tour races
Postnord UCI WWT Vårgårda
Women's road bicycle races
2019 in women's road cycling
2019 in Norwegian sport